Roger Pontet (15 June 1920 – 29 January 2009) was a French racing cyclist. He rode in the 1947, 1948 and 1949 Tour de France.

References

External links

1920 births
2009 deaths
French male cyclists
Cyclists from Paris